Cateriidae is a family of kinorhynchs in the class Cyclorhagida. It consists of a single genus, Cateria Gerlach, 1956.

Species
Cateria gerlachi Higgins, 1968
Cateria styx Gerlach, 1956

References

Kinorhyncha
Ecdysozoa genera